Franziska Giffey (Süllke, born 3 May 1978) is a German politician of the Social Democratic Party (SPD) who has been serving as Governing Mayor of Berlin since December 2021, the first woman elected to this position. She previously served as Minister for Family Affairs, Senior Citizens, Women and Youth in the government of Chancellor Angela Merkel from 2018 until 2021. From 2015 to 2018, she was the mayor of the borough of Neukölln in Berlin.

Early life and education
Born in Frankfurt (Oder), Giffey grew up in Briesen. After her Abitur in 1997, she started studying English and French at Humboldt University of Berlin in order to become a teacher, but had to leave the profession in 1998 for medical reasons. She subsequently studied administrative law at the Fachhochschule für Verwaltung und Rechtspflege (public administration) in Berlin from 1998 until 2001. During her graduate studies in European administrative management from 2003 to 2005, she worked at the Representation of Berlin to the European Union in Brussels in 2003 and at the Parliamentary Assembly of the Council of Europe in Strasbourg in 2005. In 2005, she started extra-occupational doctoral studies at the Free University of Berlin, where she received her doctorate in 2010. Her thesis dealt with the inclusion of civil society by the European Commission in EU decision-making. However, on 10 June 2021, her doctorate was annulled for plagiarism by the presidium of the Free University of Berlin.

In addition to her studies, she worked as Commissioner for European Affairs in the district administration of Neukölln from 2002 to 2010.

Political career
Giffey joined the Social Democratic Party (SPD) in 2007.
	
In 2015, Giffey succeeded Heinz Buschkowsky as mayor of the Berlin district of Neukölln, home to many immigrants and high unemployment.

Federal Minister of Family Affairs, 2018–2021
After the formation of a grand coalition between the CDU under Chancellor Angela Merkel and the SPD in the wake of the 2017 federal election, Giffey was appointed member of the fourth Merkel cabinet in March 2018, serving as Federal Minister of Family Affairs, Senior Citizens, Women and Youth. She succeeded Katarina Barley in this office, who became Federal Minister of Justice and Consumer Protection.

Following the 2018 Chemnitz protests, Giffey was the first member of Merkel's cabinet to visit the site where a 35-year-old German carpenter was stabbed to death.

In mid-2020, Giffey presented the government's first equality strategy, which bundled together measures that aim to get more women into leadership roles, narrow the gender pay gap, and improve work-life balance. By early 2021, she introduced legislation introducing stricter gender equality rules for government-controlled companies and measures to force larger listed companies to have at least one woman on their management boards.

Allegations of plagiarism and resignation 
In 2019, allegations of plagiarism prompted the Free University of Berlin to review Giffey's 2010 dissertation. In response, Giffey announced that she would resign if her doctorate was revoked and she would not run for the leadership of her party due to the ongoing investigation.

On 10 June 2021, the presidium of the Free University of Berlin unanimously stripped Giffey of her doctorate, saying she was guilty of 'at least partially intentional deception' and citing 69 instances in the 200-page thesis when citations were either not at all or improperly attributed.

Giffey resigned as minister on 19 May 2021 but immediately won the candidacy for Berlin mayor from the SPD, which she has not relinquished.

Mayor of Berlin, 2021–present 

When Berlin's governing mayor Michael Müller announced his intention not to run again for his party's leadership in the state, Giffey and Raed Saleh expressed their intention to take over as dual leaders. On 26 September 2021, the SPD, which Giffey served as the Mayoral candidate for in Berlin, would retain most seats in the Berlin House of Representatives following the 2021 Berlin state election. On 28 November 2021, a coalition agreement between the SPD, the Green Party and the Left Party in Berlin was finalized, though the proposed government program still awaited approval from individual party committees before Giffey could take office. On 5 December 2021, 91.5 percent of Berlin's SPD delegates approved the coalition agreement. On 21 December 2021, Giffey was sworn in as Mayor of Berlin after 84 Berlin House deputies voted in favor of her, while 52 voted against her and two abstained.

Giffey was nominated by her party as delegate to the Federal Convention for the purpose of electing the President of Germany in 2022.

Other activities

Corporate boards
 Berliner Stadtreinigung (BSR), Member of the advisory board (–2018)

Non-profit organizations
 Deutsches Museum, Member of the Board of Trustees
 Development and Peace Foundation (SEF), Member of the Board of Trustees (since 2022)
 Business Forum of the Social Democratic Party of Germany, Member of the Political Advisory Board (since 2020)
 German Forum for Crime Prevention (DFK), Ex-Officio Member of the Board of Trustees (2018–2021)
 German Red Cross (DRK), Member
 Lions Club, Member
 French-German Youth Office (Berlin/Paris), Chairwoman
 Total E-Quality initiative, Member of the Board of Trustees

Personal life
Giffey has been married to a veterinarian since 2009; the couple has one child. Her nephew is basketball player Niels Giffey.

References

Women mayors of places in Germany
Living people
1978 births
Social Democratic Party of Germany politicians
People from Frankfurt (Oder)
Government ministers of Germany
21st-century German politicians
21st-century German women politicians
People involved in plagiarism controversies
Mayors of Berlin
Dames Grand Cross of the Order of Isabella the Catholic
Women in Berlin